The 14"/45 caliber gun, (spoken "fourteen-inch-forty-five-caliber"), whose variations were known initially as the Mark 1, 2, 3, and 5, and, when upgraded in the 1930s, were redesignated as the Mark 8, 9, 10, and 12. They were the first  guns to be employed with the United States Navy. The gun also saw service in the British Royal Navy, where it was designated the BL 14 inch gun Mk II.

History 
The design of the 14-inch/45 caliber dates to about 1910. They entered service in 1914 aboard  and her sister ship  shortly after.

Each of the original Mark 1 built-up guns consisted of a tube without liner, jacket, eight hoops and a screw box liner. To compensate for the problem of gun drooping, four hoop-locking rings were added to the guns. The Mark 3 added three hoop locking rings and contained a longer slide, while the Mark 5 had five hoops total. Owing to the interchangeability of the guns, the battleships fitted with the 14-inch/45 caliber guns often had guns of various Marks installed on each turret.

In the 1930s, the Mark 1, 2, 3, and 5 were upgraded to allow for increased charges and muzzle velocities, resulting in the Mark 8, 9, 10, and 12, respectively. All guns employed a Welin breech block and used a Smith-Asbury mechanism, and, in the case of the Mark 12, chromium plating was introduced to prolong barrel life. The New York-class did not have their turrets modernized because their shell hoists could not accommodate the longer AP and HC shells; instead, a shorter version of shells with windshields were produced for them.

Naval action

United States Navy 

New York and Texas bombarded North Africa during landings in 1942, Pennsylvania took part in the Aleutian Islands Campaign and Texas and Nevada shelled Normandy during Operation Overlord in 1944. Throughout 1944 and 1945, Pennsylvania hit many different Pacific islands during their invasions, while New York, Texas and Nevada all took part in the invasion of Iwo Jima and the invasion of Okinawa in 1945.

Due to the attack on Pearl Harbor, both  and  never fired their main batteries in anger. However, three 14-inch/45 caliber guns formerly on Arizona and in the relining process at the time of Pearl Harbor were installed aboard Nevada in the fall of 1944 and were used in several shore bombardments in the Pacific. The aft turrets from Arizona (numbers 3 and 4) were moved to become United States Army Coast Artillery Corps Battery Arizona on the west coast of Oahu and Battery Pennsylvania on Mokapu Point.

Royal Navy 

Eight US Navy standard 14-inch/45 caliber guns, complete with mountings, built by Bethlehem Steel, were supplied to the United Kingdom in World War I. They were mounted on  monitors under the British service designation BL 14 inch gun Mk II.

Naval service

See also 
 14"/50 caliber gun – later 14" gun (American)
 BL 14 inch Mk VII naval gun – for British Royal Navy King George V-class battleships (1939)
 Greek battleship Salamis

Weapons of comparable role, performance and era 
 14-inch gun M1910 US Army coast defense equivalent
 EOC 14 inch /45 naval gun contemporary British equivalent
 Vickers 14 inch/45 naval gun contemporary Vickers-designed Japanese equivalent
 340mm/45 Modèle 1912 gun contemporary French naval gun

Surviving examples 

 On  (currently in drydock in Galveston, Texas). Texas has 9 out of 10 of her original 14-inch gun barrels that served on her from 1914 to 1923. They were refurbished, relined, and reinstalled on Texas in late 1944. The serial numbers for these 10 guns on Texas are 2, 3, 4, 5, 8, 9, 10, 12, 14, 25. Texas was the first ever battleship to be outfitted with 14-inch guns. 
 Wesley Bolin Memorial Plaza, memorial to USS Arizona and World War II, Phoenix, Arizona; one of three previously on Arizona that served on Nevada in World War II
 Pennsylvania Military Museum, Boalsburg, Pennsylvania

Notes

Bibliography

External links 

 Bluejackets Manual, 1917, 4th revision: US Navy 14-inch Mark 1 gun

Naval guns of the United States
Naval guns of the United Kingdom
World War II naval weapons
Coastal artillery
356 mm artillery